Craugastor batrachylus is a species of frog in the family Craugastoridae.
It is endemic to Mexico.
Its natural habitats are subtropical or tropical moist montane forests and subtropical or tropical moist shrubland.

References

batrachylus
Endemic amphibians of Mexico
Amphibians described in 1940
Taxonomy articles created by Polbot
Fauna of the Sierra Madre Oriental